Jalysus wickhami, the spined stilt bug, is a species of stilt bug in the family Berytidae. It is found in Central America and North America.

References

External links

 

Berytidae
Articles created by Qbugbot
Insects described in 1906